The Departure of the Shunammite Woman or Abraham Dismissing Hagar and Ishmael is a 1640 painting by the studio of Rembrandt, probably by Ferdinand Bol. It is now in the Victoria and Albert Museum in London. It shows either Hagar and Ishmael or the Shunammite woman from 2 Kings 4.

References

1640 paintings
Paintings in the collection of the Victoria and Albert Museum
Paintings by Ferdinand Bol
Paintings depicting Hebrew Bible people